Thomas William Allin (27 November 1987 – 4 January 2016) was an English cricketer who played for Warwickshire County Cricket Club.

Tom Allin was a right-arm medium-fast pace bowler who also batted right-handed. He made his debut for the county in the 2011 Clydesdale Bank 40 against Surrey, and his first-class debut came against Middlesex in May 2013. 

Allin suffered serious injuries in a road accident in October 2015. He gradually recovered physically, but suffered from mood swings. He committed suicide on 4 January 2016 aged 28 in Bideford, North Devon, by jumping from the A39 River Torridge Bridge.

References

External links
 
 

1987 births
English cricketers
Devon cricketers
Suicides by jumping in England
Warwickshire cricketers
Sportspeople from Bideford
2016 suicides